Derrima is a genus of moths of the family Noctuidae.

Species
 Derrima stellata Walker, 1858

References
Natural History Museum Lepidoptera genus database
Derrima at funet

Heliothinae